William Joseph Baroody Sr. (January 29, 1916 – July 29, 1980) was an American political figure. He was president of the American Enterprise Institute from 1962 to 1978. Baroody joined the American Enterprise Association in 1954 as executive vice president. Upon his retirement as president of the AEI he was succeeded by his son, William J. Baroody Jr., a former aide in the Ford White House.

Biography
Born in Manchester, New Hampshire, to Lebanese immigrants of Melkite Greek Catholic descent, Baroody graduated from St. Anselm College in 1936, working odd jobs to help pay his way through school. After finishing college he joined the New Hampshire Unemployment Compensation Agency. During World War II, he joined the New Hampshire War Finance Committee and then served in the US Navy as a lieutenant. After the war he was employed by the Veterans Administration. From 1950 to 1953, he was an official of the U.S. Chamber of Commerce.

As a layman, he was active in the Melkite Greek Catholic Church.

During his career Baroody championed conservative political and social views on many issues. He served as principal adviser of Barry Goldwater when the Arizona senator was the 1964 Republican Party presidential candidate. Baroody was also a friend and confidante to Richard Nixon, Gerald Ford and other Republican politicians.

Notes

American political consultants
American Enterprise Institute
American people of Lebanese descent
American Melkite Greek Catholics
1916 births
1980 deaths
New Hampshire Republicans
People from Manchester, New Hampshire
Saint Anselm College alumni
United States Navy personnel of World War II
United States Navy officers